The 2017–18 season was Gabala FK's 13th season, and their 12th in the Azerbaijan Premier League, the top-flight of Azerbaijani football. Gabala finished the season in second place, 16 points behind champions Qarabağ. In the  Azerbaijan Cup were runners-up for the second year in a row, losing to Keşla 1-0 in the final whilst they also reached the Third qualifying round of the Europa League before being knocked out by Panathinaikos.

Transfers

In

Out

Loans in

Loans out

Released

Trial

Squad

Out on loan

Friendlies

Competitions

Azerbaijan Premier League

Results summary

Results

League table

Azerbaijan Cup

Final

UEFA Europa League

Qualifying rounds

Squad statistics

Appearances and goals

|-
|colspan="14"|Players away from Gabala on loan:

|-
|colspan="14"|Players who left Gabala during the season:

|}

Goal scorers

Disciplinary record

Notes

References

External links 
Gabala FC Website
Gabala FC at UEFA.com
Gabala FC at Soccerway.com
Gabala FC at National Football Teams.com

Gabala FC seasons
Gabala
Azerbaijani football clubs 2017–18 season